Kushaha  is a village development committee in Saptari District in the Sagarmatha Zone of south-eastern Nepal. The 2011 Nepal census records a population of 6,695 people living in 1,253 individual households.

References

Populated places in Saptari District